Alec Martinez (born July 26, 1987) is an American professional ice hockey defenseman for the Vegas Golden Knights of the National Hockey League (NHL). He is a two-time Stanley Cup champion, having won with the Los Angeles Kings in 2012 and 2014. In 2014, he scored both the Western Conference Finals winning goal and Stanley Cup Final winning goal, both in overtime.

Early life
Martinez was born in the Detroit suburb of Rochester Hills, Michigan. His paternal grandfather is Spanish and his paternal grandmother is English Canadian. He grew up in Michigan before moving to Fremont, California where he played junior hockey for the Santa Clara Blackhawks and San Jose Jr. Sharks. He earned four varsity letters at Stoney Creek High School in Rochester Hills.

He played college hockey while attending Miami University in Oxford, Ohio.

Playing career

Los Angeles Kings
He was drafted 95th overall by the Los Angeles Kings in the 2007 NHL Entry Draft while playing for Miami University. He made his professional debut for the Kings' American Hockey League (AHL) minor league affiliate, the Manchester Monarchs, in 2008. A year later, he was announced to the opening roster for the 2009–10 season with Kings, in which he played four games and had no goals and no assists on six shots on goal.

He was sent back down to the Manchester Monarchs for the first 20 games of the 2010–11 season. On November 23, 2010, he was recalled by the Los Angeles Kings to replace the struggling Jake Muzzin. On November 24, Martinez scored his first NHL goal, on the power play, in 4–1 loss to the Montreal Canadiens at the Bell Centre against goaltender Carey Price. Martinez had his first multi-point game December 4, 2010, including a goal against Chris Osgood of the Detroit Red Wings in a 3–2 victory for the Kings. After joining the squad for the 2010–11 season, Martinez earned trust from former Kings Head Coach Terry Murray for solid offensive and defensive play, and that continued after Darryl Sutter replaced Murray in December 2011.

On July 8, 2011, Martinez signed a two-year, $1,475,000 contract with the Kings. On June 11, 2012, the team won the Stanley Cup.

With the 2012–13 NHL season being threatened by a lockout that ultimately wiped out half the season, on December 31, 2012, Martinez signed with the Allen Americans of the Central Hockey League. He played with them until the end of the lockout.

Martinez was injured for 10 of the Kings' first 15 games of the 2013–14 season, but wound up returning as a regular on the Kings' defense, even contributing to the team's offense.

He scored two series winners en route to the Kings' second Stanley Cup title – on June 1, 2014, Martinez scored 5:47 into overtime of Game 7 of the Western Conference Finals against the Chicago Blackhawks; 12 days later, in Game 5 of the 2014 Stanley Cup Finals against the New York Rangers, a shot by Tyler Toffoli, which rebounded off goaltender Henrik Lundqvist in double overtime, led to another Martinez goal. The goal was scored with 5:17 left in double overtime as he became the 17th player to score the Cup-winning goal in overtime. He became the first to do it since Patrick Kane in 2010 and the first to do it at home since Bob Nystrom in 1980.

On December 4, 2014, Martinez signed a 6 year $24 million extension with the Kings.

Playing a full 82 games for the only time in his NHL career (and one of only four defensemen on the team’s roster), Martinez recorded a career high 39 points in the 2016–17 season, his best season post-Stanley Cup Finals.

Vegas Golden Knights
On February 19, 2020, Martinez was traded to the Vegas Golden Knights in exchange for a second-round pick in the 2020 and St. Louis' second-round pick in the 2021 NHL Entry Draft. Martinez had a successful debut with the Golden Knights, scoring a goal and an assist in a 5–3 win over the Tampa Bay Lightning.

On July 28, 2021, Martinez signed a three-year, $15.75 million contract with the Golden Knights.

On November 11, 2021, Martinez was cut in the face by Brandon Duhaime's skate in a match against the Minnesota Wild. He would be placed on long term injured reserve as a result. He was activated off the IR on March 26, 2022.

Career statistics

Regular season and playoffs

International

Awards and honors

References

External links

 

1987 births
Living people
Allen Americans players
American men's ice hockey defensemen
American people of Spanish descent
Cedar Rapids RoughRiders players
Ice hockey players from Michigan
Los Angeles Kings draft picks
Los Angeles Kings players
Manchester Monarchs (AHL) players
Miami RedHawks men's ice hockey players
People from Rochester Hills, Michigan
Stanley Cup champions
HC TPS players
Vegas Golden Knights players
AHCA Division I men's ice hockey All-Americans